Chungmuro Station is a station on Line 3 and Line 4 of the Seoul Subway system. Platforms for both Line 3 and Line 4 are located in Chungmuro-4-ga, Jung-gu, Seoul.

This station is named after the road under which it passes, in honor of the Chosun general Yi Sunsin, who was also known by the title of Chungmugong.

Station layout

Cinema
Chungmuro is considered the best place to view Korean movies. Just outside the exit by the rear entrance to Dongguk University is Daehan Cinema (대한극장), where Chungmuro Film Festival in Seoul was first held.

Gallery

References

External links
 CHIFF

Metro stations in Jung District, Seoul
Seoul Metropolitan Subway stations
Railway stations in South Korea opened in 1985
Seoul Subway Line 3
Seoul Subway Line 4